Lou Salvador Jr. (December 4, 1940 – April 19, 2008) was a Filipino film actor. He was dubbed as "The James Dean of the Philippines".

He was the son of Lou Salvador, a famous basketball player turned film and stage producer. His father directed him in such films as Bad Boy (1957) and Barkada (1958). Salvador Jr. was a contract star of LVN Pictures.

After his retirement from the film industry in the late 70s, Salvador Jr. moved to Las Vegas, Nevada, where he died in 2008 from lung cancer at the age of 67, eight months prior to his birthday at December 4. His final resting place is located at Palm Eastern Cemetery in Las Vegas, Nevada.

References

External links 
 

1941 births
2008 deaths
Filipino male film actors
Filipino people of German descent
Filipino people of Spanish descent
Lou
Filipino expatriates in the United States